Antispila cleyerella is a moth of the family Heliozelidae that is endemic to Japan.

The forewings are dark fuscous with purple reflections. The hindwings are dark fuscous. Adults are on wing from late April to early May.

The larvae feed on Cleyera japonica. They mine the leaves of their host plant. The mine initially has the form of a spiral linear mine, but later becomes a full-depth blotch. Mines and larvae can be found from late March to mid April. Full-grown larvae cut out a case in which pupation takes place.

References

Moths described in 2006
Endemic fauna of Japan
Heliozelidae
Moths of Japan